Oriflamme Canyon is a steep mountain canyon, in San Diego County, California that descends from its head in the Laguna Mountains, at , in an arc northwestward then northeastward to join Rodriguez Canyon at the northwest end of Mason Valley, where Vallecito Wash has its source.

History
This canyon was along the route of Native Americans across the mountains and desert between the Native American peoples of what is now mountain and coastal San Diego County, California and those on the Colorado River. It was later used by Spanish, Mexican and American travelers, including U. S. Army couriers and the San Antonio-San Diego Mail Line.  The latter's passengers rode up and down the canyon on mules between Carrizo Creek Station and Lassitor's Ranch in Green Valley on the short route to San Diego in which the passengers rode over the mountains on mule or horseback.

References

Landforms of San Diego County, California
San Antonio–San Diego Mail Line
Stagecoach stops in the United States